Seth Muenfuh Sincere (born 28 April 1998) is a Nigerian footballer who plays as a right back.

Professional career
Sincere joined Yeni Malatyaspor after 4 years in the Rhapsody Academy in Nigeria. Sincere made his professional debut for Yeni Malatyaspor in a 3–1 Süper Lig loss to Fenerbahçe on 15 October 2017.

International career
He has represented Nigeria at the 2015 African Games, 2015 Africa U-23 Cup of Nations and the 2016 Summer Olympics.

Honours
Nigeria U23
 Olympic Bronze Medal: 2016

References

External links

 
 
 Yeni Malatyaspor Profile

Living people
1998 births
People from Abuja
Nigerian footballers
Olympic footballers of Nigeria
Yeni Malatyaspor footballers
Süper Lig players
Footballers at the 2016 Summer Olympics
Medalists at the 2016 Summer Olympics
Olympic bronze medalists for Nigeria
Olympic medalists in football
African Games bronze medalists for Nigeria
African Games medalists in football
Association football defenders
Nigerian expatriate footballers
Nigerian expatriate sportspeople in Turkey
Expatriate footballers in Turkey
Competitors at the 2015 African Games